The Infinite Mind was a national radio series that aired one hour a week, from 1998 to 2008.  It was independently produced and distributed by the Peabody Award-winning Lichtenstein Creative Media. The program was first hosted by Frederick K. Goodwin (the former director of the National Institute of Mental Health) from 1998 to ?, and then by best selling author Peter D. Kramer from ? to 2008. Goodwin also served as guest host on various shows during this latter time period. Public radio's John Hockenberry provided weekly commentary. The program was dropped from NPR's satellite feed after news stories reported that Goodwin had a conflict of interest. Though Goodwin drew on his thirty-plus years of clinical experience when interviewing guests who sometimes discussed pharmaceutical treatments for mental illness, it was revealed that he had been receiving financial compensation from pharmaceutical companies for consulting and physician education.

The program examined many aspects of neuroscience, mental health and the mind; and it had nearly one million listeners weekly. It received 30 major journalism honors, including a UN Media Award for a program on "War," [war in general or a particular one?] five National Headliner Awards, and three Gracie Awards. According to the show's producers, "The Infinite Mind" looked at "how the brain works, and why it sometimes does not, covering mental health, neuroscience and the mind/body connection from scientific, cultural and policy perspectives."

The series was a non-profit production with a staff of 10, including three producers, and was reportedly budgeted for approximately $20,000 per episode. Major underwriters included the National Science Foundation, the National Institutes of Health, the MacArthur Foundation, William P. Grant Foundation, and unrestricted educational grants from Eli Lilly & Company, Bristol-Myers Squibb, Pfizer and GlaxoSmithKline. According to the New York Times [reference needed], the program went from 168 public radio stations in 2001, with an average audience of about 500,000, to 240 stations and twice that many listeners in 2008. [ this sentence seems extraneous>>Because it was syndicated, it ran at different times in each market.] Lichtenstein Creative Media's president Bill Lichtenstein was the show's creator and executive producer and June Peoples served as show producer.

Topics and guests
The program was widely hailed for helping create a national dialog on the science and art of the human mind, neuroscience, mental health and the mind/body connection.  The series aired major one hour comprehensive programs on such topics as Autism (1998); Hoarding and Clutter (1999), Bullying (2003), Aspergers' Syndrome (2004); Alzheimer's (2001); Chronic Fatigue Syndrome (2000); Depression in the Brain (2004); Gambling (2003); Mental Health and Immigrants (2001); Post Traumatic Stress Disorder (2001); Schizoaffective Disorder (2006); and Teen Suicide (1999).

In the two months following the September 11th attacks, The Infinite Mind produced a series of five programs on the mental health impact of the terrorism, which were first national programs to examine the mental health impact of the September 11th attacks, as well as two live "State of Mind" broadcasts that featured guests Tipper Gore, Rosalynn Carter, Al Franken, Judy Collins, David Straithairn, Surgeon General David Satcher and Marian Wright Edelman, among others.  For the broadcasts, producers did groundbreaking primary research with the American Psychological Association into the extent of PTSD and trauma nationally following the September 11th attacks.

The program featured the leading experts in the field of neuroscience, mental health and the mind such as Steven Pinker, Department of Brain and Cognitive Sciences at MIT.
In addition to world-leading scientific researchers and medical professionals, The Infinite Mind featured subjects of interest to a broad listening audience with celebrity guests including author John Updike; actors Carrie Fisher, Stanley Tucci, Anthony Edwards, Mercedes Ruehl, Margot Kidder and David Straithairn; comedians Richard Lewis and Lewis Black; the Firesign Theater; author William Styron and his wife Rose Styron; baseball batting champ Wade Boggs; former First Lady Rosalynn Carter; documentary filmmaker Ric Burns; television pioneer Norman Lear; business journalist James Cramer; Tipper Gore; Children’s Defense Fund founder Marian Wright Edelman; and live performances and discussions with musicians including Aimee Mann, Jessye Norman, Judy Collins, Suzanne Vega, Janis Ian, Laurie Anderson, Cowboy Junkies, Loudon Wainwright III, Philip Glass, and Emanuel Ax, and the casts of the Broadway hits Avenue Q and Wicked.

Use of Virtual Reality/Second Life

Lichtenstein Creative Media was a pioneer of the social uses of the on-line 3-D virtual world, Second Life. For "The Infinite Mind," Lichtenstein Creative Media produced the first ever concert and live radio broadcasts from Second Life in August 2006, with singer Suzanne Vega, author Kurt Vonnegut who appeared in avatar form, Internet visionary Howard Reingold, and design guru John Maeda.

Pharmaceutical funding controversy
On May 9, 2008, Slate.com posted an article about a segment, "Prozac Nation: Revisited," with four medical experts who said that the link between antidepressants and suicide had been overblown. The show did not disclose the fact that all four experts, including Goodwin, had financial ties to the makers of antidepressants, nor did it disclose that The Infinite Mind had received unrestricted grants from Eli Lilly, the manufacturer of Prozac.

On November 21, 2008, The New York Times reported that the staff of Senator Charles Grassley had "uncovered" the fact that host Fred Goodwin had received "at least $1.3 million from 2000 to 2007 giving marketing lectures for drugmakers, income not mentioned on the program", largely speaking fees for talks to clinicians.  Goodwin told The New York Times that The Infinite Minds executive producer, Bill Lichtenstein, was aware of his activities, while Lichtenstein said he had not been informed. National Public Radio dropped The Infinite Mind from its satellite feed.  The show was already slated to end production due to a lack of funding.

Goodwin said that in 2005, recognizing that his involvement with some drug companies might be seen to be in conflict with his role as host, he and Lichtenstein agreed that he would assume the role of guest host, involved only with programs that did not relate to treatment issues. Peter Kramer served as regular host during this time.  When Goodwin resumed his role as host in 2008, he was no longer involved in pharmaceutical speaking activities.

References

External links
The Infinite Mind official website via LCMedia, Inc.
"Apology to The Infinite Mind," Mental Health Watch, March 19, 2009

2000s American radio programs